Thomas Alston may refer to:

Sir Thomas Alston, 1st Baronet (c. 1609–1678), High Sheriff of Bedfordshire
Sir Thomas Alston, 3rd Baronet (1676–1714), MP for Bedford 1698–1701
Sir Thomas Alston, 5th Baronet (1724–1774), MP for Bedfordshire 1747 and Bedford 1760
Tom Alston (1926–1993), American professional baseball player